Below is a list of squads used in the 1985 Arab Cup.

Group A

Jordan
Coach: Mohammad Awad

Qatar
Coach:  Dino Sani

Saudi Arabia
Coach: Khalil Al-Zayani

Group B

Bahrain
Coach:  Keith Burkinshaw

Iraq B
Coach: Anwar Jassam

Mauritania
Coach:  Gerhard Schmidt

References

External links
Details - rsssf.com

Squad
1985